Arthit Tanusorn (Thai อาทิตย์ ธนูศร) is a Thai retired footballer.

External links
Thaisoccernet.com
Goal.com
Thailandsusu.com

1975 births
Living people
Arthit Tanusorn
Association football goalkeepers
Arthit Tanusorn